The Mindanao serin (Chrysocorythus mindanensis) is a species of finch in the family Fringillidae.

It is found in the Philippines. Its natural habitats are subtropical or tropical moist montane forest and subtropical or tropical high-altitude grassland. 

The Mindanao serin was formerly considered conspecific with the Indonesian serin (Chrysocorythus estherae), together called the mountain serin, but was split as a distinct species by the IOC in 2021.

References

Chrysocorythus
Endemic birds of the Philippines
Birds of Mindanao
Mindanao serin